A gazebo is a pavilion structure.

Gazebo may also refer to:

 Gazebo (musician) (Paul Mazzolini; born 1960), Italian singer
 Gazebo simulator, an open source robotics simulator
 The Gazebo, a 1959 black comedy film starring Glenn Ford and Debbie Reynolds
 The Gazebo (play), a play by Alec Coppel

See also
 The Gazebo (disambiguation)